"We're Gonna Move" is a song by Elvis Presley. The song is credited to Elvis Presley and Vera Matson, the wife of Ken Darby, the principal writer, published by Elvis Presley Music. The song was featured in the 20th Century Fox movie Love Me Tender and was released as an RCA Victor EP in 1956.

Background
"We're Gonna Move" was recorded on August 24, 1956.

"We're Gonna Move" appeared in the 1956 movie Love Me Tender. The song was released on an RCA Victor EP from the movie, Love Me Tender (EP), EPA-4006, which also included the title track, "Poor Boy", and "Let Me".

The recording appeared on the 1959 compilation album A Date with Elvis.

Adriano Celentano recorded the song in 1973 and released it as a 45 single. G.I. Blues, Kent Lundberg EP-Band & Quartet, Long Chris, and Charlie und Co. have also recorded the song.

A lyric from the song has been cited as the inspiration for the Beatles' "Fixing A Hole" off of Sgt. Pepper's Lonely Hearts Club Band.

Soundtrack

Instead of a full long-playing album soundtrack, for Love Me Tender the four songs appearing in the film were released as an extended-play, seven-inch 45 RPM record on RCA Records, Love Me Tender, catalog EPA 4006, during November 1956. The EP was certified Platinum by the RIAA. The EP reached #10 on the Billboard EP chart, and #22 on the Billboard 200 album chart.  It peaked at #9 on Top Pop Albums chart with sales of over 600,000, as well as making it to #35 on the singles chart. The four EP soundtrack songs were recorded at 20th Century Fox's Stage One in Hollywood, at three sessions on August 24, September 4, and October 1, 1956.

Personnel
 Elvis Presley - vocals
 Vito Mumolo - lead acoustic guitar
 Luther Rountree - rhythm acoustic guitar
 Dom Frontieri - accordion
 Mike "Myer" Rubin - double bass
 Richard Cornell - drums
 Rad Robinson - backing vocals
 Jon Dodson - backing vocals
 Charles Prescott -backing vocals

References

Sources
Guralnick, Peter. Last Train to Memphis: The Rise of Elvis Presley. Little, Brown; 1994. .
Guralnick, Peter. Careless Love: The Unmaking of Elvis Presley. Back Bay Books; 1999. .
Guralnick, Peter; Jorgensen, Ernst. Elvis Day by Day: The Definitive Record of His Life and Music. Ballantine; 1999. .
Hopkins, Jerry. Elvis—The Biography. Plexus; 2007. .
Jorgensen, Ernst. Elvis Presley—A Life in Music: The Complete Recording Sessions. St Martin's Press; 1998. .

Elvis Presley songs
Songs written by Elvis Presley
1956 songs
Songs written for films